Džemal is a masculine given name which may refer to:

 Džemal Berberović (born 1981), Bosnian retired footballer
 Džemal Bijedić (1917–1977), Yugoslav Communist politician
 Džemal Hadžiabdić (born 1953), Bosnian retired footballer
 Džemal Mustedanagić (born 1955), Bosnian footballer and manager 
 Džemaludin Mušović (born 1944), Bosnian footballer and manager
 Džemal Perović (born 1956), Montenegrin politician and civic activist

See also
 Jamal
 Jamaal
 Gamal

Masculine given names
Bosnian masculine given names